Music for the Recently Deceased is the second studio album by Australian metalcore band I Killed the Prom Queen that was released on 14 November 2006.

In August 2005, I Killed the Prom Queen flew to Sweden to record their follow-up album, Music for the Recently Deceased. By late 2005, they had completed recording the album but in January 2006 vocalist Michael Crafter was fired. Instead of releasing the album as it was, they decided to hire a new vocalist and replace Crafter's tracks. Ed Butcher, from United Kingdom band The Hunt for Ida Wave was recruited. New lyrics were written by Cameron and Butcher, while some lyrics that the whole band had contributed during the Crafter sessions were retained. Music for the Recently Deceased was produced by Fredrik Nordström, whose other credits included Dimmu Borgir, Darkest Hour, At the Gates and In Flames, and by Patrik J. Sten.
The album was released on 31 July 2006 by Stomp Entertainment and peaked at #27 on the Australian ARIA Charts. In the first month of its release in the United States the album sold 1,238 copies. A video was produced for the song "Say Goodbye"

Re-releases
On 19 May 2008 a Tour Edition of the album was released with the additions of 2 live songs recorded at the Sydney Deadfest, 4 songs featuring Michael Crafter on vocals and the music video for Say Goodbye. The tour edition was limited to 5,000 individually hand-numbered copies. Recently the limited edition was released additionally to the 5000 original copies.

On 20 May 2011 a 2-CD version of the album was released to coincide with the band's reformation and 2011 Australian tour. The first disc contained the previously official release version with Ed Butcher's vocals, and the second disc featured the original version with Michael Crafter singing. The Crafter version was previously unreleased, with a few tracks leaking in the past. This version was released on a new label, We Are Unified, because the band's previous label, Stomp Entertainment, had gone bankrupt and stopped production and distribution on all its releases.

Track listing

Personnel 
I Killed the Prom Queen
 Ed Butcher – vocals 
 Jona Weinhofen – guitar, keyboards, vocals
 Kevin Cameron – guitar
 Sean Kennedy – bass
 J. J. Peters – drums
Additional personnel 
 Sons of Nero - artwork

Trivia 
 The lyrics, "...Every living thing on this earth dies alone"; that phrase has never sounded so sweet to my ears...", from the song "€666", is a loose reference to a line from the film Donnie Darko.
 The song title "€666" was a band in-joke at the studio hire price when converted from Australian dollars into Euros.
 The album name is a reference to the movie Beetlejuice, in which there is a book titled 'Handbook for the Recently Deceased'.

Charts

References 

I Killed the Prom Queen albums
2006 albums
Metal Blade Records albums
Albums with cover art by Sons of Nero
Albums produced by Fredrik Nordström